Panic in the City is a 1968 American science fiction thriller film directed by Eddie Davis and written by Eddie Davis and Charles E. Savage. The film is about nuclear weapons, set and filmed on location in Los Angeles in 1967. The film stars Howard Duff, Linda Cristal, Stephen McNally,  Nehemiah Persoff, Anne Jeffreys, Oscar Beregi Jr. and Gregory Morton. The film was released in October 1968.

Plot
An agent of the National Bureau of Investigation, Dave Pomeroy, investigates the death of a European nuclear scientist and discovers a Communist plot to detonate a nuclear bomb in Los Angeles in order to instigate World War III. Once the bomb is activated and Pomeroy receives a lethal dose of ionizing radiation from it, he sacrifices himself to save the city by flying the bomb out over the Pacific Ocean in a helicopter.

Cast
Howard Duff as Dave Pomeroy 
Linda Cristal as Dr. Paula Stevens 
Stephen McNally as James Kincade 
Nehemiah Persoff as August Best 
Anne Jeffreys as Myra Pryor 
Oscar Beregi Jr. as Dr. Paul Cerbo 
Gregory Morton as Steadman 
Dennis Hopper as Goff 
George Barrows as Ernest 
John Hoyt as Dr. Milton Becker 
Steve Franken as Hal Johnson 
Wesley Lau as Police Lt. Brady

See also
List of American films of 1968

References

External links
 
 

1968 films
1960s thriller films
American thriller films
Films about nuclear war and weapons
United Pictures Corporation
Films scored by Paul Dunlap
American neo-noir films
Films set in Los Angeles
Films shot in Los Angeles
Films critical of communism
Cold War films
Films about World War III
Films directed by Eddie Davis
1960s English-language films
1960s American films